Kibaru is a village in Põhja-Sakala Parish, Viljandi County in Estonia.

References

Villages in Viljandi County